Charan's Public School is a co-educational school in Ulsoor, Bangalore, Karnataka, India.  It was founded in 1990. It offers Karnataka State Board Syllabus with languages, Kannada, Sanskrit, English as an optional language.

Charan's Public School received an award from the government of Karnataka for scoring 100% in SSLC 2013. The school has successfully secured many prizes and awards in sports, Olympiad, singing, and dance competitions.

This school also has lovingly environment, with wooden benches and strong concrete walls, with a big Blackboard.

Houses 
The house system is a feature common to public schools in India. The four houses of the Charan's Public School are: 
 Champions 
 Challengers
 Conquerors
 Contenders

The houses compete against each another in academics, games, track and field sports, aquatics, arts, literary, and drama and music competitions and the best team gets a award

References

Private schools in Bangalore